Ifi Amadiume (born 23 April 1947) is a Nigerian poet, anthropologist and essayist.  She joined the Religion Department of Dartmouth College, New Hampshire, US, in 1993.

Biography
Born in Kaduna to Igbo parents, Ife Amadiume was educated in Nigeria before moving to Britain in 1971. She studied at the School of Oriental and African Studies, University of London, gaining a BA (1978) and PhD (1983) in social anthropology respectively. She was a research fellow for a year at the University of Nigeria, Enugu, and taught and lectured in the UK, Canada, US and Senegal. Her fieldwork in Africa resulted in two ethnographic monographs relating to the Igbo: African Matriarchal Foundations (1987), and the award-winning Male Daughters, Female Husband (Zed Press, 1987). The latter is considered groundbreaking owing to the fact that a number of years before the articulation of queer theory, it argued that gender, as constructed in Western feminist discourse, did not exist in Africa before the colonial imposition of a dichotomous understanding of sexual difference. Her book of theoretical essays, Reinventing Africa, appeared in 1998. Extracts from her work is included in the anthology Daughters of Africa (1992).

As a poet she participated in Festac '77, the Second World Black and African Festival of Arts and Culture, and her 1985 collection, Passion Waves, was nominated for the Commonwealth Poetry Prize. She won the Flora Nwapa Society Award for her 2006 book of poetry, Circles of Love.

She is on the advisory board of the Centre for Democracy and Development, a non-governmental organisation that aims to promote the values of democracy, peace and human rights in Africa, particularly in the West African sub-region. 

Amadiume is widely regarded for her pioneering work in feminist discourse: "her work made tremendous contributions to new ways of thinking about sex and gender, the question of power, and women's place in history and culture". She has nevertheless attracted criticism for her "assumption that [the] female is necessarily equated with peace and love."

Works

Poetry
 Passion Waves, London: Karnak House, 1985, .
 Ecstasy, Longman Nigeria, 1995. Association of Nigerian Authors 1992 Literary Award for Poetry. 
 Returning
 Circles of Love, Africa World Press, 2006, 
 Voices Draped in Black, Africa World Press, 2008,

Anthropology
 African Matriarchal Foundations: The Igbo Case, London: Karnak House, 1987, 
 Male Daughters, Female Husbands: Gender and Sex in an African Society, London: Zed Press, 1987, . St. Martin’s Press, 1990.
 Re-inventing Africa: Matriarchy, Religion and Culture, Interlink Publishing Group, 1997, 
 The Politics of Memory: Truth, Healing, and Social Justice (edited, with Abdullahi A. An-Na’im), London: Zed Books, 2000. 
 Daughters of the Goddess, Daughters of Imperialism: African Women Struggle for Culture, Power and Democracy, London: Zed Books, 2000.

References

External links
Biography
Centre for Democracy and Development

1947 births
Igbo writers
Nigerian writers
Dartmouth College faculty
Living people
21st-century Nigerian writers
20th-century essayists
People from Kaduna
Nigerian feminists
Nigerian expatriates in the United States